Eldrid is a Norwegian feminine given name. Notable people with the given name include:

Eldrid Erdal (1901–1997), Norwegian politician
Eldrid Lunden (born 1940), Norwegian poet and professor
Eldrid Nordbø (born 1942), Norwegian politician
Eldrid Straume (1929–2014), Norwegian archaeologist

References

Norwegian feminine given names